Fußball Club Association Hamburg was a German football club established in 1893 in Hamburg. The team played as part of the Hamburger-Altonaer Fußball Bund between 1896 and 1900 and was a founding member of the DFB at Leipzig in 1900. The short-lived club disappeared soon afterwards.

Football clubs in Germany
Defunct football clubs in Germany
Defunct football clubs in Hamburg
Association football clubs established in 1893
Association football clubs disestablished in 1900
1893 establishments in Germany
1900 disestablishments in Germany